State Road 28 is an IB-class road in western Serbia, connecting Mali Zvornik with Bosnia and Herzegovina at Kotroman. It is located in Šumadija and Western Serbia.

Before the new road categorization regulation given in 2013, the route wore the following names: M 19.1, P 111, M 5, M 21 and P 112 (before 2012) / 144, 143, 145 and A4 (after 2012).

The existing route is a main road with two traffic lanes. By the valid Space Plan of Republic of Serbia the road is not planned for upgrading to motorway, and is expected to be conditioned in its current state.

Section from Užice to Serbia-Bosnia and Herzegovina border is a part of E761, while Užice-Sušica part also bears the route E763.

Sections

See also 
 Roads in Serbia
 European route E761
 European route E763

References

External links 
 Official website - Roads of Serbia (Putevi Srbije)
 Official website - Corridors of Serbia (Koridori Srbije) (Serbian)

State roads in Serbia